Hinduism has approximately 1.2 billion adherents worldwide (15-16% of the world's population). Hinduism is the third largest religion in the world behind Christianity (31.5%) and Islam (23.3%).

Most Hindus are found in Asian countries, and the majority of India and Nepal are Hindus. Countries with more than 500,000 Hindu residents and citizens are (in decreasing order) India, Nepal, Bangladesh, Indonesia (with Bali being 87% Hindu), Pakistan, Sri Lanka, the United States, Malaysia, United Kingdom, Myanmar, Australia, Mauritius, South Africa, Canada, and the United Arab Emirates.

There are significant numbers of Hindu enclaves around the world, with many in  South Africa, Canada, Australia and New Zealand. Hinduism is also practiced by the non-Indic people including the Balinese of Bali island (Indonesia), Tengger and Osing of Java (Indonesia), the Balamon Chams of Vietnam, and Ghanaian Hindus in Ghana.

Background
Hinduism is a heterogeneous religion and consists of many schools of thought. Hinduism has no traditional religious order, centralized authority, governing body, or prophets; Hindus can be polytheistic, monotheistic, pantheistic, monistic, agnostic, humanist, or atheistic. Estimates of Hinduism by country reflect this diversity of thought and way of life.

Demographic estimates
Demographic estimates of Hindu populations by country have been published by the Pew Research Center in 2012, as well as US State Department's International Religious Freedom Report 2006.

By total number, India has the most Hindus. As a percentage, Nepal has the largest percentage of Hindus in the world followed by India and Mauritius. The Hindu population around the world as of 2020 is about 1.2 billion (making it the world's third-largest religion after Christianity and Islam), of which nearly around 1.1 billion Hindus live in India.https://www.bc.edu › files › pdfPDF
The Global Religious Landscape As per a statistical study, there are an estimated 100 million Hindus who live outside of India. In 2010, only two countries in the world had a majority of its population as Hindus – Nepal and India. On Mauritius, 48.14 percent of the population were Hindu, according to the 2015 census. Bangladesh, Indonesia, Fiji, Bhutan, Guyana, Suriname, Trinidad and Tobago, and Sri Lanka have very large and influential Hindu minorities.

By country
Sources used for the table below include the US State Department, the CIA World Factbook, adherents.com, thearda.com,  Pew Research Center. and as identified.

By region

These percentages were calculated by using the above numbers. The first percentage, in the 4th column, is the percentage of the population that is Hindu in a specific region (Hindus in the region * 100/total population of the region). The last column shows the Hindu percentage compared to the total Hindu population of the world (Hindus in the region * 100/total Hindu population of the world).(Note: Egypt, Sudan, and other Arab Maghreb countries are counted as part of North Africa, not the Middle East).''

See also

 List of Hindu empires and dynasties
 List of religious populations
 Christianity by country
 Islam by country
 Ahmadiyya by country
 Jewish population by country
 Baháʼí Faith by country
 Buddhism by country
 Sikhism by country
 List of countries by irreligion

Notes

References

Web-sources